Mahdi Mohammed Gulaid "Khadar" was the former deputy Prime Minister of the Federal Republic of Somalia, from 2017 to 2022 and briefly served as the acting Prime Minister of the Federal Republic of Somalia from 25 July 2020 to 23 September 2020. He is of the Eidagale subdivision of Garhajis, a sub-clan of the wider Isaaq clan.

Career

Early career 
Prior to taking office, he practised law in Somaliland and has worked with the second Electoral Commission of Somaliland as legal advisor.

Deputy Prime Minister 
As a Deputy Prime Minister, Gulaid chaired Somalia’s National Security Architecture including the prevention and countering of violent extremism. Most recently, he co-chaired the Somalia Partnership Forum in Brussels which concluded with resounding success.

References 

Living people
1973 births
21st-century prime ministers of Somalia
Prime Ministers of Somalia
People from Hargeisa